The Five Lotus Spring is an artesian karst spring located in the city of Jinan, Shandong Province, China. The spring is located in the old city moat to the southeast of the historical city centre. A spring pool with a water level above that of the moat is formed by an arrangement of natural rocks.

See also
List of sites in Jinan

Bodies of water of Shandong
Springs of China